Réalistes is the fourth album by British indie pop band Comet Gain.

Track listing

2002 albums
Comet Gain albums
Kill Rock Stars albums